The Bauschinger effect refers to a property of materials where the material's stress/strain characteristics change as a result of the microscopic stress distribution of the material. For example, an increase in tensile yield strength occurs at the expense of compressive yield strength.  The effect is named after German engineer Johann Bauschinger.

While more tensile cold working increases the tensile yield strength, the local initial compressive yield strength after tensile cold working is actually reduced. The greater the tensile cold working, the lower the compressive yield strength.

It is a general phenomenon found in most polycrystalline metals. Based on the cold work structure, two types of mechanisms are generally used to explain the Bauschinger effect:
 Local back stresses may be present in the material, which assist the movement of dislocations in the reverse direction. The pile-up of dislocations at grain boundaries and Orowan loops around strong precipitates are two main sources of these back stresses.
 When the strain direction is reversed, dislocations of the opposite sign can be produced from the same source that produced the slip-causing dislocations in the initial direction. Dislocations with opposite signs can attract and annihilate each other. Since strain hardening is related to an increased dislocation density, reducing the number of dislocations reduces strength.

The net result is that the yield strength for strain in the opposite direction is less than it would be if the strain had continued in the initial direction.

Mechanism of action 
Severe unidirectional cold working results in accumulation of dislocation at barriers to dislocation movement. When stresses are applied in the reverse direction, the dislocations are now aided by the back stresses that were present at the dislocation barriers previously and also because the back stresses at the dislocation barriers in the back are not likely to be strong compared to the previous case. Hence the dislocations glide easily, resulting in lower yield stress for plastic deformation for reversed direction of loading.

Consequence of Bauschinger effect 
Metal forming operations  result in situations exposing the metal workpiece to stresses of reversed sign. The Bauschinger  effect contributes to work softening of the workpiece, for example in straightening of drawn  bars or rolled sheets, where rollers subject the workpiece to alternate bending stresses, thereby reducing the yield strength and enabling greater cold drawability of the workpiece.

See also
 Backlash, a similar extrinsic behavior in large-scale mechanical systems.
 Fatigue

References

Materials science